Crime in St. Louis includes an overview of crime both in the city of St. Louis and in the Greater St. Louis metropolitan area. Crime in the city increased from the 1960s through the early 1990s as measured by the index crime rate, followed by a decline in crime rates through 2014. Despite decreasing crime, rates of violent crime and property crime in both the city and the metropolitan area remain higher than the national metropolitan area average. In addition, the city of St. Louis consistently has been ranked among the most dangerous cities in the United States. As of April 2017, St. Louis has the highest murder rate in America. At the end of 2017, St. Louis metropolitan had 205 murders, 159 of which were within the city limits. The new Chief of Police, John Hayden said two-thirds (67%) of all the murders and one-half of all the assaults are concentrated in a triangular area in the North part of the city.

Trends

Prior to the 1930s, only sporadic information is available regarding crime in the city and region. As early as 1894, there were 80 homicides in the city, according to the St. Louis Post-Dispatch. For the period 1901 to 1910, the city recorded 804 homicides, with a homicide rate for the period of 12 per 100,000 residents. In 1915, the city police reported 74 homicides, while 103 people were recorded as having died of homicide by the medical examiner. In 1921, there were 138 homicides in St. Louis according to the St. Louis city coroner, giving a rate of about 14 per 100,000 residents. After 1934, St. Louis reported crime statistics to the FBI, which compiled and published reports of index crime and homicides in the annual Uniform Crime Reports.

Starting in the 1950s, the city of St. Louis saw increases in its index crime and homicide rates, which both peaked in the early 1990s. However, St. Louis saw its peak number of index crimes and homicides in 1969 and 1970, respectively. Although some of the reduction in the number of index crimes since the early 1990s can be attributed to St. Louis's loss of population, other factors include low inflation, the decline of open-air drug markets, and a decline in crack cocaine use.

In 2009, 67 police departments in St. Louis County reported 33,718 index crimes, and three departments did not report crime to the FBI (these include the departments of Wellston, Normandy, and Lakeshire).

In 2010, the St. Louis Metropolitan Police Department (the city police department) reported 33,782 index crimes, which was the lowest total reported index crimes since 1967 (however, index crimes in 1967 did not include larceny under $50, arson, or non-negligent manslaughter). The index crime rate fell 9.2 percent from 2009, with a 15.6 percent decline in violent crime and a 7.6 percent decline in property crime. However, Chief of Police Daniel Isom noted in the report that both homicides and burglaries remain problems in the city.

For 1958–1959, UCR data specified that Greater St. Louis included St. Louis, St. Charles, and Jefferson counties in Missouri, and Madison and St. Clair counties in Illinois.

2011 and 2012

In 2011, the St. Louis Metropolitan Police Department reported 113 homicides to the FBI, falling 21% from 2010, and producing a rate of 35.3 per 100,000 residents. In addition, the city reported 31,619 index crimes, a reduction of 5.7% from 2010, for a rate of 9,866.9 per 100,000. For the metropolitan area, the FBI estimated 102,357 index crimes took place in the region in 2011, a 0.8% decline from 2010, for a rate of 3,624.3 per 100,000. The FBI estimated 215 homicides took place in the region in 2011, a decline of 1.8% from 2010, for a rate of 7.6 per 100,000.

For 2012, preliminary crime data released by the St. Louis Metropolitan Police Department showed a decline of 12.4% in crime, with the overall crime rate lower than it was in 1970. St. Louis reported 113 homicides, the same as 2011, while it reported a decline in both violent and property crimes from 2011. Violent crimes declined 4.9%, including a 16.5% decline in robberies to 1,777 the lowest since 1953, while property crime declined 14.2%, with a 28.9% decline in burglaries. Rape was up 5.9%, and vehicle thefts were up 3.6% in 2012. At the end of 2017, St. Louis had 205 murders, up 9% from 2016.

Policing
Law enforcement in the metropolitan area is provided by a variety of municipal and county police departments and by federal agencies. In the city of St. Louis, the St. Louis Metropolitan Police Department provides police service, while the city sheriff's department provides courtroom protection services, serves eviction notices, and transports prisoners between courts and jails within the city. In St. Louis County, 67 police departments, including the St. Louis County Police Department, provide police services, while the county also maintains a sheriff's office for courtroom services and civil actions. Nearby counties such as St. Charles County have both municipal police departments and a county-wide sheriff that provide police services. The Missouri State Highway Patrol maintains a troop servicing the region with its headquarters in St. Charles County. An FBI field office is located in the city of St. Louis, while the Bureau of Alcohol, Tobacco, Firearms, and Explosives maintains a group supervisor office in the city under the direction of the Kansas City Field Division.

In 1994, Morgan Quitno (a private research and publishing company purchased by CQ Press in 2007) began publishing reports that named St. Louis City among the "most dangerous" cities in the United States. Although the methodology for the reports changed during the 1990s, St. Louis retained its ranking in the top ten most dangerous cities, and it was named the most dangerous city in the United States three times, most recently in 2010.

For the two years that it was ranked by CQ Press (in 2008 and 2009), the City of St. Louis alone ranked considerably more dangerous than the St. Louis metropolitan statistical area.

St. Louis's ranking has not been without controversy; University of Missouri–St. Louis professors and criminologists Richard Rosenfeld and Janet Lauritsen criticized the rankings for their lack of transparency and their over-reliance on Uniform Crime Reports as data sources. They argue that the rankings are not meaningful indicators of risk of victimization, as certain factors such as age, lifestyle, and neighborhood play a significant role in crime risk.

Upon St. Louis's ranking as most dangerous city in 2010, the administration of Washington University in St. Louis criticized the rankings as flawed, and representatives for St. Louis Mayor Francis G. Slay noted that crime in the city decreased each year since 2007 and criticized the report for not including regional crime information.

In 2014, St. Louis was ranked as the 19th most dangerous city in the world by the Mexican aid organization CCSP-JP (El Consejo Ciudadano para la Seguridad Publica y la Justicia Penal).

As of 2017, St. Louis is ranked as the most dangerous city in America. There were 66 homicides per 100,000 residents. This rate is more than 10 times the national homicide rate.

See also
Alcohol laws of Missouri
Crime in Missouri
 Loren and Dora Doxey, accused of murder by arsenic
United States cities by crime rate

References

 
St. Louis